The 2018 V de V Challenge Monoplace was a multi-event motor racing championship for open wheel, formula racing cars held across Europe. The championship features drivers competing mainly in 2 litre Formula Renault single seat race cars that conform to the technical regulations for the championship. The season began at Circuit de Barcelona-Catalunya on 23 March and will finish at Estoril on 4 November after seven double-header rounds.			
			
Drivers compete in three classes depending on the type of car they drive. Those competing in the current Tatuus FR 2.0 2013 car, as well as the previous Barazi-Epsilon FR2.0–10 car, which are in use since 2010, are included in Class A. Older Formula Renault 2.0 machinery along with other cars such as Formula BMW and Formula Abarth encompass Class B. From 2018 on, Formula 4 cars built to FIA regulations are allowed to race in V de V Challenge Monoplace, being included in Class C.

Teams and drivers

Race calendar and results			
			
The calendar was published on 13 October 2017. In 2018, due to the race duration increasing from 20 to 30 minutes per race, each circuit will host two races instead of three.

Standings

Points system			
			
Points are awarded following a complex system. Drivers receive a set of points according to their overall position in each race, as well as an additional set of points according to their position within the class their car belongs to. No separated standings for classes A, B and C are issued. The points distribution is as follows:			
			
			
			
The total number of points scored in each round is multiplied by a coefficient, depending on the round. Only the best 12 results are counted towards the overall standings, whereas all results are valid towards the Gentlemen Drivers standings.

References

External links			
			
			
			
			
V de V Challenge Monoplace			
V de V Challenge Monoplace			
V de V Challenge Monoplace